The Eydam and Handel Company, or Adolph Eydam and Philip Handel Company, was formed in 1885, until partnership broke up in 1892 when Eydam moved to rival company of C. F. Monroe (Eydam returned in 1915 to head up decorating department).  It was formed in Meriden, Connecticut, and over the years produced lamps and glass designs. The company was incorporated in 1903. As of c. 1911, P. J. Handel was president and treasurer of the business. In Meriden Illustrated (c. 1911), "[The company has] obtained [a] national reputation for the artistic and the high quality of their product. A number of patents are controlled which makes their business a very successful one. There is a force of 125 people skilled in the various branches and steadily engaged." Also at this time, the Handel Company maintained a showroom in New York City at the corner of West Broadway and Murray St. with dedicated sales agents for the entire United States. The production location was in Meriden on East Main Street, just east of Broad Street.

Over the years, the following books have focused on the designs of Handel lamps: Joanne Grant's The painted lamps of Handel (c. 1978); De Falco, Hibel & Hibel's Handel lamps: Painted shades and glassware (1986); Carole Hibel's The Handel lamps book (1999); and Robert DeFalco's Metal overlays by Handel (c. 2000). Handel Company lamps were also included in Martin May's Great art glass lamps: Tiffany, Duffner & Kimberly, Pairpoint, and Handel.

As of 2016, lamp designs by the Handel Company are in the following museum collections: Brooklyn Museum; Corning Museum of Glass; Museum of American Glass in Millville, NJ; Tucson Museum of Art; and the Virginia Museum of Fine Arts. Over the years, Handel lamps have been exhibited in the 1889 Delavan Opera House exposition in Meriden and the 1915 Industrial art exhibition at the National Museum (Smithsonian) in Washington, DC. Handel lamps have been shown and assessed on the Antiques Roadshow TV program.

In 2008, a Handel Company "fine and rare elk lamp" (c. 1917) was sold at Sotheby's in New York for US$85,000 in its "20th century design" sale.

References

1885 establishments in Connecticut
Companies based in New Haven County, Connecticut
Meriden, Connecticut
Defunct manufacturing companies based in Connecticut